Austin Publishing Group is an open-access publisher of academic journals and ebooks established in 2014 in Hyderabad, India. It has addresses in Irving, Texas, USA; in Amsterdam, the Netherlands; and in Tokyo, Japan, but is actually based in Hyderabad.

Activities 
The company uses an open-access model of publishing which charges the authors. The company claims that articles are peer reviewed. The company has been criticized for predatory publishing practices and is contained on Beall's list of potential predatory journals and publishers.

Criticism 
The company or its journals have been criticized for sending unsolicited emails, for publishing the same article in several journals, for deceptive publisher location, and for not having achieved indexing in any recognized service. Journals from Austin publishers fulfilled numerous criteria of predatory journals. Austin Publishers and Austin Journal of Pharmacology and Therapeutics were included in a position statement from the American College of Clinical Pharmacology on  ″opportunistic journals″, which according to the authors do not realize their promises and should be avoided.  

In 2017 Austin's journal Austin Addiction Sciences appointed a fake scientist as editorial board member. An Australian professor had applied for membership in the editorial board using a photograph of popular singer Kylie Minogue wearing glasses and a made-up curriculum vitae of his Staffordshire Terrier, including a bachelor's degree from the non-existing Staffordshire College of Territorial Science, a Master of Early Canine Studies awarded by the non-existing Shenton Park Institute for Canine Refuge Studies, and a doctoral degree for canine studies from the non-existing Subiaco College of Veterinary Science.

In the same year, Austin Journal of Pharmacology and Therapeutics  accepted a spoof manuscript about ‘midi-chlorians’ – fictional entities which live inside cells and give Jedi their powers in Star Wars. The fake authors of the manuscript were Dr Lucas McGeorge (an allusion to movie director and producer George Lucas) and Dr Annette Kin (an allusion to Anakin Skywalker). The paper included a passage lifted from Star Wars Episode III, in which the villain Emperor Palpatine tells Anakin about Darth Plagueis – a dark lord who gained the power to bring people back from the dead. The acceptance of that paper was considered as evidence that Austin publishers did not provide meaningful peer review, despite being paid for it.

References

Academic publishing companies
Open access publishers
Publishing companies of India
Publishing companies established in 2014
Companies based in Hyderabad, India